Santuario Alta Vista refers to a specific area located just outside the very small village of Alta Vista, located north of Puerto Vallarta and west of Compostela and just south of Las Varas in the Mexican state of Nayarit. Alta Vista is in the shadow of Sierra de Zapotan. It is known locally as The Valley of Hope (Valle de Esperanza)

El Santuario, or "Sanctuary" in English, was founded and secured by Jennifer Almaraz in 2010.  Reclamation of the area began in the spring of 2016. Nearby the Sanctuary are ancient petroglyphs known in Mexico as "La Pila del Rey".

There is limited space at the Sanctuary, which originated the term "eco-Divine" in its search to describe what is available at the Sanctuary. The property seeks to employ practices that are Earth-friendly: cob and adobe structures, permaculture and holistic methods of healing. The Sanctuary does not espouse a specific religious view, but encourages all visitors to grow in their spiritual practice.

The area of Santuario Alta Vista is very rural.

Geography of Nayarit
Valleys of Mexico